Vivante Corporation  is a fabless semiconductor company headquartered in Sunnyvale, California, with an R&D center in Shanghai, China. The company was founded in 2004 as GiQuila and focused on the portable gaming market. The company's first product was a DirectX-compatible graphics processing unit (GPU) capable of playing PC games. In 2007, GiQuila changed its name to Vivante and changed the direction of the company to focus on the design and licensing of embedded graphics processing unit designs. The company is licensing its Mobile Visual Reality to semiconductor solution providers that serve embedded computing markets for mobile gaming, high-definition home entertainment, image processing, and automotive display and entertainment.

Vivante is named as a contributor to the HSA (Heterogeneous System Architecture) Foundation.

In 2015, VeriSilicon Holdings Co., Ltd. acquired Vivante Corporation in an all-stock transaction.

Products

Since changing directions Vivante has developed a range of GPU cores that are compliant with the OpenGL ES 1.1 and 2.0 standards as well as the OpenVG standard. Created by VeriSilicon support for the Vulkan API 1.0 and for OpenVX 1.0 is provided for at least 6 major desktop and embedded operating systems.

2D graphics products & Vector GPUs, summarized by the vendor under the term "Composition Processing Cores" (CPC), sometimes mentioned with the feature of single pass composition blending capability of 8 or higher, are the GC300, GC320, GC350 and GP355 (OpenVG core)with the additional listing of GC200 and GC420.
NXP further mentions GC255 in a presentation for their i.MX models.
The NXP i.MX8 series will come with 2 units of the GC7000Lite or GC7000 vector processor.
For 3D graphics products please see the table below.

Legend for the notes in below listing:
 Pipelined FP/INT double (64-bit), single/high (32-bit) and half precision/medium (16-bit) precision IEEE formats for GPU Compute and HDR graphics, Source:

Adoption
They have announced that as of 2009 they have at least fifteen licensees who have used their GPUs in twenty embedded designs. Application processors using Vivante GPU technology:
 Marvell ARMADA range of SoCs
 NXP / Freescale i.MX Series
 Ingenic Semiconductor Jz4770
 ICT Godson-2H
 Rockchip RK2918
 Actions Semiconductor ATM7029
 HiSilicon K3V2
 InfoTM iMAP×210

GC8000 Series 
After Vivante was sold to VeriSilicon the Arcturus GC8000 series was released by VeriSilicon, which supports newer technologies such as OpenCL 3.0, OpenVX 1.2, OpenVG 1.1, OpenGL ES 3.2, OpenGL 4.0 and Vulkan 1.1.

Linux support

There are no plans on writing a new DRM/KMS driver kernel driver for the Vivante hardware, since Vivante previously put out their Linux kernel component under the GNU General Public License (GPL), instead of maintaining it as a proprietary blob. The free Gallium3D-style device driver etna_viv has surpassed Vivante's own proprietary user-space driver in some benchmarks. It supports Vivante's product line of GC400 Series, GC800 Series, GC1000 Series, GC2000 Series, GC3000 Series, GC4000 Series, and GC7000lite.

See also
 PowerVR – available as SIP block to 3rd parties
 Mali – available as SIP block to 3rd parties
 Adreno – found only on Qualcomm Snapdragon, could be available as SIP block to 3rd parties
 Tegra – family of SoCs for mobile computers, the graphics core could be available as SIP block to 3rd parties
 Atom family of SoCs – with Intel graphics core, not licensed to 3rd parties
 AMD mobile APUs – with AMD graphics core, not licensed to 3rd parties

References

External links
 

Companies based in Sunnyvale, California
Companies established in 2004
Graphics hardware companies
Graphics processing units
Fabless semiconductor companies
Technology companies based in the San Francisco Bay Area
Semiconductor companies of the United States